Nondalton Airport  is a state-owned public-use airport located one nautical mile (1.85 km) northwest of the central business district of Nondalton, in the Lake and Peninsula Borough of the U.S. state of Alaska.

As per Federal Aviation Administration records, the airport had 825 passenger boardings (enplanements) in calendar year 2008, a decrease of 50.9% from the 1,679 enplanements in 2007. This airport is included in the FAA's National Plan of Integrated Airport Systems for 2009–2013, which categorizes it as a general aviation facility.

Facilities and aircraft 
It has one runway designated 2/20 with a gravel surface measuring 2,800 by 75 feet (853 x 23 m). For the 12-month period ending December 31, 2008, the airport had 1,250 aircraft operations, an average of 104 per month: 60% general aviation and 40% air taxi.

Airlines and destinations

References

External links 
 FAA Alaska airport diagram (GIF)
 

Airports in Lake and Peninsula Borough, Alaska